Manuel Becerra may refer to:

People
 Manuel Becerra (settler) (1762– c. 1849), Tejano settler and politician
 Manuel Becerra Bermúdez (1820–1896), Spanish politician
 Manuel Becerra Fernández (1867–1940), Spanish politician who served as Minister of Justice during the Second Spanish Republic
 Manuel Becerra Salazar (b. 1983), Mexican poet

Places
 Manuel Becerra (Madrid Metro), Madrid Metro Station